The 2008–09 season is the Melbourne Victory's first season of football (soccer) in Australia's new women's league, the W-League.

Season

Fixtures

Round 1

Round 2

Round 3

Round 4

Round 5

Round 6

Round 7

Round 8

Round 9

Round 10

Standings

Players

Leading scorers
The leading goal scores from the regular season.

Milestones
First game = 2–0 win home V Central Coast Mariners
Largest win = 3–0 win home V Perth Glory & away V Adelaide United
Largest loss = 3–1 loss home V Brisbane Roar

Melbourne Victory FC (A-League Women) seasons
Melbourne Victory W-League